El Cardoso de la Sierra is a municipality located in the province of Guadalajara, Castile-La Mancha, Spain. According to the 2004 census (INE), the municipality had a population of 75 inhabitants.

References

External links 

www.elcardosodelasierra.com

Municipalities in the Province of Guadalajara